Seán McGrath (born 27 December 1991) is an Irish hurler who plays as a full forward for the Kilmacud Crokes senior team.

McGrath has also lined out for Dublin in both the minor and under-21 grades and has enjoyed some success. He has won one Leinster medal as a member of the Dublin under-21 team.

At club level McGrath is a two-time county club championship medalist with Kilmacud Crokes.

Playing career

Club

McGrath plays his club hurling with Kilmacud Crokes.

After coming to prominence in various juvenile grades, McGrath was a member of the Kilmacud minor hurling team in 2007. He won his first minor championship medal that year following a comprehensive 1–11 to 0–5 defeat of Na Fianna.

Two years later McGrath secured a second championship medal in the minor grade as Kilmacud defeated St. Vincent's by 2–11 to 2–6.

By 2012 McGrath was a member of the Kilmacud Crokes senior hurling team. That year he won a senior championship medal following a 2–10 to 0–9 defeat of Cuala. It was Kilmacud's first championship title in twenty-seven years.

Inter-county

McGrath first came to prominence on the inter-county scene as a member of the Dublin minor hurling team. Hen enjoyed little success in this grade before moving onto the county under-21 hurling team.

In 2011 McGrath won a Leinster medal with the under-21 hurlers, following a 1–18 to 0–11 defeat of Wexford. Dublin later qualified for an All-Ireland showdown with Galway. A 3–14 to 1–10 defeat was McGrath's lot on that occasion.

Honours

Team
Kilmacud Crokes
Dublin Senior Club Hurling Championship (1): 2012
Dublin Minor Club Hurling Championship (1): 2007, 2009

Dublin
Leinster Under-21 Hurling Championship (1): 2011

References

External links

1991 births
Living people
Kilmacud Crokes hurlers
Dublin inter-county hurlers